Toddington is a village and civil parish in north Gloucestershire in Tewkesbury Borough, located approximately 12 miles (20 km) north-east of Cheltenham with a population of around 300, increasing to 419 at the 2011 census

The village is split into two, the "Old Town" near the church and the "New Town" at the crossing of the B4077 and B4632 roads. The village pub, the Pheasant is situated at the heart of the village, beside the village shop. Despite the size of the village, it has a large church, St Andrew's which contains the marble tombs of local nobility, the Tracy family, who variously lived at Sudeley Castle, Hailes Abbey and Toddington Manor.

Toddington Manor lies between New Town and Old Town, and was bought by the Turner Prize-winning artist Damien Hirst in 2005; he plans to turn the manor into a museum of his work.

The Square, Toddington, is a residential conversion of the old stable block of the Manor House. The Square dates back to c. 1800 and was possibly built by C. Beazley for Charles Hanbury-Tracy.

Toddington railway station is located in New Town on the heritage line, the Gloucestershire Warwickshire Steam Railway, that runs between Broadway and Cheltenham Racecourse.

See also
 Taddington, Gloucestershire
 Teddington, Gloucestershire

References

External links

Villages in Gloucestershire